Yarrawin, New South Wales is a bounded rural locality and a civil parish of Gowen County, New South Wales.

Location
The parish is on the Castlereagh River, between Coonabarabran and Binnaway, New South Wales.

History
Before European colonization the Weilwan were the traditional custodians of the parish.
Yarrawin was named for the Yarragrin Run, established in the 19th century.

References

Localities in New South Wales
Geography of New South Wales
Central West (New South Wales)